The  is the 21st edition of the Japan Film Professional Awards. It awarded the best of 2011 in film. The ceremony took place on May 26, 2012 at Theatre Shinjuku in Tokyo.

Awards 
Best Film: Kantoku Shikkaku
Best Director: Amir Naderi (Cut)
Best Actress: Nana Eikura (Tokyo Park, Antoki no Inochi)
Best Actor: Hidetoshi Nishijima (Cut)
Best New Director: Hitoshi Ōne (Moteki)
Best New Director: Kōji Maeda (Konzen Tokkyū)
Special: Yoshinori Chiba (For production of Guilty of Romance.)
Best Distinguished Service: Mako Midori (For Keibetsu performance and her longtime work.)

10 best films
 Kantoku Shikkaku (Katsuyuki Hirano)
 Antoki no Inochi (Takahisa Zeze)
 Tokyo Park (Shinji Aoyama)
 Guilty of Romance (Sion Sono)
 Tada's Do-It-All House (Tatsushi Ōmori)
 I Wish (Hirokazu Koreeda)
 Hospitalité (Kōji Fukada)
 Keibetsu (Ryūichi Hiroki)
 Shinsei Kamattechan Rock 'n' Roll wa Nariyamanai (Yu Irie)

References

External links
  

Japan Film Professional Awards
2012 in Japanese cinema
Japan Film Professional Awards
May 2012 events in Japan